Tonio Kröger is a novella by Thomas Mann, written early in 1901, when he was 25. It was first published in 1903. A. A. Knopf in New York published the first American edition in 1936, translated by Helen Tracy Lowe-Porter.

Plot summary
The narrative follows the course of a man's life from his schoolboy days to his adulthood. The son of a north German merchant and a "Southern" mother (Consuelo) with artistic talents, Tonio inherited qualities from both sides of his family. As a child, he experiences conflicting feelings for the bourgeois people around him. He feels both superior to them in his insights and envious of their innocent vitality. This conflict continues into Tonio's adulthood, when he becomes a famous writer living in southern Germany. "To be an artist," he comes to believe, "one has to die to everyday life." These issues are only partially resolved when Tonio travels north to visit his hometown. While there, Tonio is mistaken for an escaped criminal, thereby reinforcing his inner suspicion that the artist must be an outsider relative to "respectable" society. As Erich Heller—who knew Thomas Mann personally—observed, Tonio Krögers theme is that of the "artist as an exile from reality" (with Goethe's Torquato Tasso [1790] and Grillparzer's Sappho [1818] for company). Yet it was also Erich Heller who, earlier, in his own youth, had diagnosed the main theme of Tonio Kröger to be the infatuation and entanglements of a passionate heart, destined to give shape to, intellectualize, its feelings in artistic terms.

Connection to other works
Tonio Kröger forms a pair with the more famous story, Death in Venice (Der Tod in Venedig). They both describe the life of an artist and express Thomas Mann's views on art. In one story the artist travels from south to north, in the other from north to south. One journey ends in a tenuous reconciliation, and the other in death. But, as T. J. Reed has pointed out,
"In Der Tod in Venedig, Thomas Mann returns from excursions into allegory and once more writes directly about a literary artist. But the directness is not that of Tonio Kröger. There he was expressing lyrically his immediate experience, formulating and coming to terms with what he had gone through...."

Thus the importance of the work lies, chiefly, in its autobiographical character, as well as in its contribution, through the description of an amitié particulière, to the theory of love.

The novel was made into a film in 1964, directed by Rolf Thiele.

English translations 

 H. T. Lowe-Porter (1936)
 David Luke (1988)
 Joachim Neugroschel (1998)
 Jefferson S. Chase (1999)

See also

 Júlia da Silva Bruhns, Thomas Mann's mother, inspiration for Consuelo, Tonio's mother.

References
 Erich Heller, The Ironic German: A Study of Thomas Mann (London, Secker & Warburg, 1958), pp. 68ff. (on the genesis of the work), 286 (on the date of publication).
 Frank Donald Hirschbach, The Arrow and the Lyre: A Study of the Role of Love in the Works of Thomas Mann (The Hague, M. Nijhoff, 1955), passim (but especially the section "The Loves of Two Artists: Tonio Kröger and Death in Venice", op. cit., pp. 14ff.).
 Steven Millhauser, "Some Thoughts on Tonio Kröger", Antaeus, No. 73/74 (Spring 1994), pp. 199–223.
 Lee Slochower, "The Name of Tadzio in Der Tod in Venedig", German Quarterly, vol. 35, No. 1 (January 1962).
 Alfred D. White, "Tonio Kröger: Anthropology and Creativity", Oxford German Studies, vol. 34, No. 2 (September 2005), pp. 217–223.

Notes

External links

 

1903 German-language novels
German autobiographical novels
Novellas by Thomas Mann
Roman à clef novels
German novels adapted into films
1903 German novels